Raavan is a 2022 Indian Bengali-language action thriller film written and directed by MN Raj and produced by Jeet, Gopal Madnani and Amit Jumrani under the banner of  Jeetz Filmworks. It stars Jeet, Lahoma Bhattacharya and Tanusree Chakraborty.

Plot

Cast
 Jeet as Professor Ram Mukherjee/Raavan
 Lahoma Bhattacharya as Rai, Ram's student turned lover
 Tanusree Chakraborty as ACP Sumaiyya Jahan
 Biswanath Basu as Inspector Chulbul Pandey
 Shataf Figar as Joint Commissioner Rajiv Sharma, the main antagonist
 Alok Jain as Om Damani
 Rana Mitra as MLA Amar Chowdhury
 Jack Bhattacharya as Sudhir Dutta

Production
The first-look poster was released on Dussehra.

Release
The film was released theatrically on April 29, 2022.

Soundtrack

The music of the film is composed by Savvy with lyrics  written by Prosen, Budhaditya Mukherjee  and Ritam Sen.

Reception 
The film was reviewed in The Times of India, which gave it three stars out of five; by Sangbad Pratidin and Ei Samay, both of which gave it 3.5 stars out of 5; and by Anandabazar Patrika.

References

External links 
 

2022 films
2022 romantic comedy films
Indian romantic comedy films
Bengali-language Indian films
2020s Bengali-language films